The 2010–11 Washington Capitals season is the 37th season for the Washington Capitals in the National Hockey League (NHL). Despite the Capitals' first round exit in the 2010 Playoffs, ticket prices for this season were increased between 13 and 50 percent.

Regular season 
The Capitals finished the regular season having been shut out a league-high 11 times, tied with the Toronto Maple Leafs.

Divisional standings

Conference standings

Schedule and results

Pre-season

Regular season

Playoffs 

The Capitals won the Southeast Division title for the fourth consecutive season. The Capitals also clinched as the Eastern Conference regular season champions. The Capitals played the New York Rangers in the opening round and won 4–1, but were swept by the Tampa Bay Lightning in the Eastern Conference Semifinals.

Key:  Win  Loss  Clinch Playoff Series  Eliminated from playoffs

Player statistics

Skaters
Note: GP = Games played; G = Goals; A = Assists; Pts = Points; +/− = Plus/minus; PIM = Penalty minutes

Goaltenders
Note: GP = Games played; Min = Time on ice (minutes); W = Wins; L = Losses; OT = Overtime losses; GA = Goals against; GAA= Goals against average; SA= Shots against; SV= Saves; Sv% = Save percentage; SO= Shutouts

†Denotes player spent time with another team before joining Capitals. Stats reflect time with the Capitals only.
‡Traded mid-season
Bold/italics denotes franchise record

Awards and records

Awards

Milestones

Milestones

Transactions
The Capitals have been involved in the following transactions during the 2010–11 season.

Trades

Free agents acquired

Free agents lost

Claimed via waivers

Lost via waivers

Player signings

Draft picks
Washington's picks at the 2010 NHL Entry Draft in Los Angeles, California.

Farm teams

Hershey Bears 
The Capitals' American Hockey League affiliate will remain to be the Hershey Bears in the 2010–11 season.

South Carolina Stingrays 
The South Carolina Stingrays remain Washington's ECHL affiliate for the 2010–11 season.

See also 
 2010–11 NHL season

References

External links
 2010–11 Washington Capitals season at ESPN
 2010–11 Washington Capitals season at Hockey Reference

W
W
Washington Capitals seasons
Cap
Cap